IK Gauthiod is a Swedish football club located in Grästorp  in Västra Götaland County.

Background
Since their foundation on 30 July 1924 IK Gauthiod has participated mainly in the lower divisions of the Swedish football league system.  The club currently (2016) plays in Division 2 which is the fourth tier of Swedish football. They play their home matches at the Lunnevi 1 in Grästorp.

The club is affiliated to the Västergötlands Fotbollförbund.

Season to season

External links
 IK Gauthiod – Official Website

Footnotes

Football clubs in Västra Götaland County
Association football clubs established in 1924
1924 establishments in Sweden